The International Transport Workers' Federation (ITF) is a democratic global union federation of transport workers' trade unions, founded in 1896. In 2017 the ITF had 677 member organizations in 149 countries, representing a combined membership of 19.7 million transport workers  in all industrial transport sectors: civil aviation, dockers, inland navigation, seafarers, road transport, railways, fisheries, urban transport  and tourism. The ITF represents the interests of transport workers' unions in bodies that take decisions affecting jobs, employment conditions or safety in the transport industry.

Organisation
The ITF works to improve the lives of transport workers globally, encouraging and organising international solidarity among its network of affiliates.

The ITF is allied with the International Trade Union Confederation (ITUC). Any independent trade union with members in the transport industry is eligible for membership of the organization.

The ITF represents the interests of transport workers' unions in bodies such as the International Labour Organization (ILO), the International Maritime Organization (IMO) and the International Civil Aviation Organization (ICAO). The organization also informs and advises unions about developments in the transport industry in other countries or regions of the world, and organise international solidarity actions when member unions in one country are in conflict with employers or government.

The ITF's headquarters is located in London and it has offices in Abidjan, Amman, Brussels, Singapore, Montreal, Hong Kong, Nairobi, New Delhi, Rio de Janeiro, Sydney and Tokyo.

The International Transport Workers' Federation is governed by its constitution. The Constitution states that ITF is run by an elected executive board meeting twice a year.

The ITF executive is highly concerned about the effects of globalisation, the increased concentration of ownership of international transport companies, global warming, public service improvement, the privatisation of large formerly state-run transport enterprises and automation and the future of work. It notes that the World Trade Organization (WTO) plays a central role in this process and considers it necessary for unions to exert what pressure they can on the WTO to respect social and labour standards in its agreements. It is particularly concerned about the effect that the WTO's General Agreement on Trade in Services (GATS) could have on transport workers by breaking down national transport regulations. It considers it important to oppose the inclusion of transport-related services in the GATS. It considers that the major international finance organisations, including the World Bank and regional development banks, have had a "serious negative impact both on the quality of transport services and on the employment and working conditions of transport workers." It also sees the neoliberal economic policies being promoted by regional blocks including the EU, MERCOSUR, ASEAN, NAFTA, and SADC as being generally injurious to transport workers. It believes it is necessary to create solidarity networks between trade unions, and to improve the coordination between ITF sections, so that effective responses can be made to large multinational business entities which span several regions and many sectors of workers.

History
The ITF was founded in 1896 at a meeting in London, organised by Havelock Wilson, Ben Tillett, Tom Mann and Charles Lindley.  Initially named the International Federation of Ship, Dock and River Workers, in 1898, it absorbed the International Commission for Railwaymen, and so renamed itself as the "International Transport Workers' Federation".  In 1904, its headquarters moved to Germany, then in 1919 to Amsterdam, where it grew, under the leadership of Edo Fimmen.  By 1939, with World War II imminent, its headquarters moved to Bedford in England, then to London, where they remain.

The federation's first post-war conference was held in 1946 in Zurich, where a new constitution was adopted.  In 1949, it established a section for civil aviation workers, and in 1974 one for workers in tourism.  It has campaigned heavily against flags of convenience, and in the late 1990s, the ITF operated a floating museum, the mV Global Mariner, which sailed around the world. The vessel was originally built in England in 1979 as the mV Ruddbank, and sank in 2000 off the Venezuelan coast after colliding with a container ship.

The ITF holds a congress every five years in accordance with the ITF Constitution, Rule IV. The congress has supreme authority within the ITF. The 40th Congress was held in Vancouver, Canada, from 14 to 21 August 2002. The 41st Congress was held in Durban, South Africa in August, 2006. The 42nd Congress was held in Mexico City from 5–12 August 2010. The 43d Congress  - from 10–16 August 2014 in Sofia, Bulgaria. The 44th Congress was held in Singapore  from 14–20 October 2018.

The ITF set up an Arab world and Iran network to deal with, amongst other matters, what it described as the "cancer" of abandonment of ships. Following the 2013 abandonment of MV Rhosus in Beirut, Lebanon, the unloading and storing for years of its explosive cargo, and the ensuing catastrophic explosion on 4 August 2020, the network coordinator said  "The flood of calls to ITF in the Arab region has never stopped. Since we created the network and seafarers [became] aware of us, the numbers of calls are going up and up".

Affiliates
In January 2020, the following unions were affiliated to the ITF:

Leadership

General Secretaries
1896: Ben Tillett
1896: Robert Peddie
1896: Tom Chambers
1904: Ben Tillett
1904: Hermann Jochade
1919: Edo Fimmen
1942: Jacobus Oldenbroek
1950: Omer Becu
1960: Pieter de Vries
1965: Hans Imhof
1968: Charles Blyth
1977: Harold Lewis
1993: David Cockcroft
2014: Stephen Cotton

Presidents
1893: Tom Mann
1901: Tom Chambers
1904: Ben Tillett
1904: Hermann Jochade
1920: Robert Williams
1925: Charlie Cramp
1933: Charles Lindley
1946: John Benstead
1947: Omer Becu
1950: Robert Bratschi
1954: Arthur Deakin
1955: Hans Jahn
1958: Frank Cousins
1960: Roger Dekeyzer
1962: Frank Cousins
1965: Hans Düby
1971: Fritz Prechtl
1986: Jim Hunter
1994: Eike Eulen
1998: Umraomal Purohit
2006: Randall Howard
2010: Paddy Crumlin

See also

 ITF Seafarers' Trust
 Charles Lindley
 Flag of convenience
 M/T Haven
 Universe Tankships Inc of Monrovia v International Transport Workers’ Federation [1982] 2 All ER 67
 International Transport Workers Federation v Viking Line ABP [2008] IRLR 143 (C-438/05)

Notes

External links
 ITF official website
 Catalogue of the ITF archives, held at the Modern Records Centre, University of Warwick

 
Trade unions established in 1896
International organisations based in London
Global union federations
Trade unions based in London